The geography of South Australia incorporates the south central part of the continent of Australia. It is one of the six states of Australia. South Australia is bordered on the west by Western Australia, to the north by the Northern Territory, Queensland to the northeast, and both New South Wales and Victoria to the east. South Australia's south coast is flanked by the Great Australian Bight and the Southern Ocean.

The northern and western parts of the state are extremely arid, in central Australia, dominated by Lake Eyre and Lake Torrens, mostly dry salt lakes. This arid area is sparsely populated, with many large cattle stations, and significant areas protected as national parks, or as Aboriginal lands. The only significant roads through these areas are the Stuart Highway north from Port Augusta to the Northern Territory, the Eyre Highway across the Nullarbor Plain to Western Australia, and the Barrier Highway east to Broken Hill in New South Wales. These highways have corresponding railways: the Trans-Australian Railway going west and east, and the Adelaide–Darwin railway going north.

The coastline includes cliffs against the Great Australian Bight including the western side of Eyre Peninsula. The coast is less rugged on Spencer Gulf and Gulf St Vincent (separated by Yorke Peninsula), Fleurieu Peninsula, Encounter Bay and The Coorong. Bordering the east of Gulf St Vincent is the Temperate Grassland of South Australia.

The highest point in the state is Ngarutjaranya at 1,435 metres (4,708 ft) in the Musgrave Ranges in the northwest corner of the state. About half the state is less than 150 m above sea level.

The arid north is delineated from the more fertile southeast by Goyder's Line, first surveyed in the 1860s, and which has proven to be a remarkably accurate northern boundary marking where sustainable agriculture can be carried out. Three deserts are contained within South Australia's borders: Great Victoria Desert, Strzelecki Desert and Sturt Stony Desert.

East of the Mount Lofty Ranges, the Murray River flows west from New South Wales and Victoria, then south adjacent to the ranges. The Murray River is the only large, permanent river in the state.

Climate

Southern areas of South Australia have a Mediterranean climate, while the rest of the state has a drier arid climate and semi-arid climate. The state's mean temperature range is 29 °C in January and 15 °C in July. Daily temperatures in parts of the state in January & February can be as high as 48 °C. The highest maximum temperature in that state 50.7 °C (123.3 °F), was recorded at Oodnadatta on 2 January 1960. This is also the highest official temperature recorded in the whole of Australia. The lowest minimum temperature recorded in South Australia was -8.2°C (17.2°F), at Yongala on 20 July 1976.

Examples

References

External links

 

 
South Australia